St. Edmond High School is a private, Roman Catholic high school in Fort Dodge, Iowa.  It is located in the Roman Catholic Diocese of Sioux City.

Background
St. Edmond was named in honor of Bishop Edmond Heelan, Bishop of the Sioux City Diocese from 1918 to 1948. School nickname is the "Gaels".

Athletics 
The Gaels compete in the North Central Conference in the following sports:

Cross Country 
Volleyball 
Football 
Basketball
Boys' 2000 Class 2A State Champions
Wrestling
Track and Field
 Boys' 2009 Class 2A State Champions
 Boys' 2011 Class 2A State Champions
Golf 
Tennis
 Boys' 2013 Class 1A State Cahmpions
Baseball 
 2009 Class 2A State Champions
Softball

See also
List of high schools in Iowa

External links
 School Website

Notes and references

Catholic secondary schools in Iowa
Private high schools in Iowa
Schools in Webster County, Iowa
Fort Dodge, Iowa